Cyberware is neuroprosthetics.

Cyberware may also refer to:

Cyberware (company), a Californian company producing high-end 3D scanners
Cyberware Productions, Finnish record company, distributing Neuroactive (among others)

See also
Cyberwar (disambiguation)